The following is a list of Protea species.

Table of Protea species

References 

Protea